Port-Royal (1629–1710) was a settlement on the site of modern-day Annapolis Royal, Nova Scotia, part of the French colony of Acadia.

In 1629, William Alexander (the younger) established a Scottish colony at the site and named it Charles Fort.

Upon the handing back of Acadia to the French by the Treaty of Saint-Germain-en-Laye (1632) the settlement was occupied by the French and renamed Port-Royal. For most of the period until the Siege of Port Royal by the Kingdom of Great Britain in 1710, the village was the capital of Acadia. Port-Royal was the primary Acadian settlement until Acadians migrated out of the community to Pisiguit, Cobequid, Grand Pre, and Beaubassin (Isthmus of Chignecto) in the 1680s.

Context 

The Habitation at Port-Royal was established on the other side of the river by Pierre Du Gua de Monts, with the able assistance of individuals such as Samuel de Champlain, Louis Hébert and Jean de Biencourt de Poutrincourt et de Saint-Just, in 1605 and it lasted until 1613.

Scottish colony

In 1621 King James I of England granted to Sir William Alexander, 1st Earl of Stirling all of Nova Scotia, which then included New Brunswick. During the Anglo-French War (1627–1629), under Charles I of England, by 1629 the Kirkes took Quebec City and Lord Ochiltree (Sir James Stewart of Killeith) started a colony on Cape Breton Island at Baleine.

On July 28, 1629, Sir William sent a ship, his son William Alexander (the younger), and seventy Scottish settlers who established the first incarnation of "New Scotland" which they named Charles Fort, at present-day Annapolis Royal on the site of the future Fort Anne (see Charles Fort - National Site). During this time there were few French inhabitants in the colony. This set of British triumphs, leaving Cape Sable (present-day Port La Tour, Nova Scotia) as the only major French holding in North America, was not destined to last.

In 1631, under the terms of the Treaty of Saint Germain-en-Laye, the colonists were ordered to abandon the fort to the French, who soon renamed it Port-Royal, the same name as their previous colony. The official handover did not take place until late in 1632 and this gave Captain Andrew Forrester, commander of the then Scottish community the opportunity to cross the Bay of Fundy with twenty-five armed men and raid Charles de Saint-Étienne de la Tour's Fort Sainte-Marie at Saint John, New Brunswick.

In 1633, protecting the boundary of Acadia, Charles de la Tour, the French commander of Acadia, made a descent upon Machias, Maine from his seat at Port-Royal, killing two of its six defenders, and carrying the others away with their merchandise. The French then established Fort Ste. Marie de Grâce as the capital on the LaHave River before re-establishing Port-Royal.

French colony
In 1635, Governor of Acadia Charles de Menou d'Aulnay de Charnisay moved settlers from present day LaHave, Nova Scotia to Port-Royal (present day Annapolis Royal), and the Acadian people began to establish their roots. Under D'Aulnay, the Acadians built the first dykes in North America and cultivated the reclaimed salt marshes.

During this time, Acadia was plunged into what some historians have described as a civil war; the two main centres were Port-Royal (present day Annapolis Royal), where d'Aulnay was stationed, and present-day Saint John, New Brunswick, where Charles de Saint-Étienne de la Tour was stationed.

Acadian Civil War

Battle of Port Royal (1640)
Charles de Saint-Étienne de la Tour arrived from present day Saint John, New Brunswick and attacked Port-Royal (Annapolis Royal) with two armed ships. D'Aulnay's captain was killed, while La Tour and his men were forced to surrender. In response to the attack, D'Aulay sailed out of Port-Royal to establish a blockade of La Tour's fort at present day Saint John, New Brunswick.

Battle of Port Royal (1643)

In 1643, La Tour tried to capture Port-Royal again. La Tour arrived at Saint John from Boston with a fleet a five armed vessels and 270 men and broke the blockade. La Tour then chased d'Aulnay's vessels back across the Bay of Fundy to Port-Royal (Annapolis Royal). D'Aulnay resisted the attack, and seven of his men were wounded and three killed. La Tour did not attack the fort, which was defended by twenty soldiers. La Tour burned the mill, killed the livestock and seized furs, gunpowder and other supplies.

d'Aulnay ultimately won the war against La Tour with the 1645 siege of present-day Saint John, New Brunswick. After the siege, La Tour went to live in Quebec. After defeating La Tour at Saint John, from the capital Port-Royal (Annapolis Royal), d'Aulnay administered posts at LaHave, Nova Scotia; Pentagouet (Castine, Maine); Canso, Nova Scotia; Cap Sable (Port La Tour, Nova Scotia); the Saint John River (Bay of Fundy) and Miscou Island.

After d'Aulnay died (1650), La Tour re-established himself in Acadia.

English colony

Battle of Port Royal (1654)
In 1654, Colonel Robert Sedgwick led a force to capture Port-Royal made up of one hundred New England volunteers and two hundred professional soldiers sent to New England by Oliver Cromwell, the first professional English soldiers sent to North America. Prior to the Battle, Sedgwick captured and plundered present day Castine, Maine and La Tour's fort at present day Saint John, New Brunswick. Sedgwick also took La Tour prisoner. The defenders of Port-Royal numbered only about 130. After resisting the English landings and defending the fort during a short siege, the outnumbered Acadians surrendered after negotiating terms that allowed French inhabitants who wished to remain to keep their property and religion. Soldiers and officials were given transport to France while the majority of Port-Royal residents remained unharmed. However, in violation of the surrender terms, Sedgwick's men rampaged through the Port-Royal monastery, smashing windows, doors, paneling and even the floor boards before burning the monastery and the newly constructed Port Royal church. The English occupied Acadia for the next 16 years with a small garrison, leaving the Acadian residents mostly undisturbed.

French colony 
In 1667, Port-Royal (present day Annapolis Royal) was returned to France with the Treaty of Breda (1667). In a census taken in 1671 there were 361 Acadians in the Port-Royal area. During King Philip's War, Jacques de Chambly was Governor of Acadia. Another census in the late 1680s shows 450 Acadians in the entire area of Port-Royal.

King William's War

Battle of Port Royal (1690)

During King William's War, Port-Royal (present day Annapolis Royal) served as a safe harbor for French cruisers and supply point for Wabanaki Confederacy to attack the New England colonies encroaching on the Acadian border in southern Maine.

The Battle of Port Royal (1690) began on May 9. Sir William Phips of New England arrived with 736 men in seven English ships. Governor de Meneval fought for two days and then capitulated. The garrison was imprisoned in the church and Governor de Meneval was confined to his house. The New Englanders levelled what was begun of the new fort. The residents of Port-Royal were imprisoned in the church and administered an oath of allegiance to the King.

Phips left, but war ships from New York City arrived in June which resulted in more destruction. The seamen burned and looted the settlement, including the parish church.

Raid on Port Royal (1693)
In response to assisting Pierre Maisonnat dit Baptiste, English frigates attacked Port-Royal (Annapolis Royal). The New Englanders burned almost a dozen houses and three barns full of grain. Port Royal was again made the capital in 1699.

Queen Anne's War

During Queen Anne's War, there was a New England blockade of Port Royal and then three attempts to lay siege to the capital. The last siege ultimately resulted in the British conquest of Acadia and Nova Scotia. Despite the blockade, Port Royal was occasionally used as a home port by French privateers and pirates such as Captain Crapo.

Blockade of Port Royal (1704)
In 1704, in retaliation for the Raid on Deerfield, Major Benjamin Church created a blockade of Port-Royal. Church was instructed not to attack the capital because the action was not authorized from London. Before daylight, on July 2, two English warships and seven smaller vessels entered the Port Royal basin. They captured the guard station opposite Goat Island as well as four Acadians. Landing at Pointe aux Chesnes on the north shore, they took a family prisoner. A woman from the family was sent to the fort to demand its surrender. The blockade lasted seventeen days; those in the fort awaited an attack. Church had moved on to conduct the real purpose of his expedition: the Raid on Grand Pré, Raid on Pisiguit, and Raid on Chignecto. He returned to Port Royal and then with a brief exchange of gunfire, returned to Boston.</ref>

Siege of Port Royal (June 1707)

Two major British efforts to besiege the town in 1707 met with failure. The first siege during the war happened on June 17 and lasted eleven days. Colonel John March, the most senior officer in all of Massachusetts was sent to defeat the capital. Acadian governor Daniel d'Auger de Subercase successfully defended the capital.

Siege of Port Royal (August 1707)

Colonel Francis Wainwright led the second siege on August 20. It lasted eleven days. Subercase and his troops killed sixteen New Englanders and lost three soldiers. Again the British retreated.

Siege of Port Royal (1710)

On September 24, 1710, the British returned with 36 ships and 2000 men, and again laid siege to the capital in what would be the final Conquest of Acadia. Subercase and the French held out until October 2 when the approximately 300 defenders of the fort surrendered, ending French rule in Acadia. The following year, after the Acadian and Indian success at the nearby Battle of Bloody Creek (1711), the Acadians and Indians unsuccessfully attempted to lay siege to the capital.

British colony 

After the conquest of Acadia with the Siege of Port Royal in 1710, the British changed the name from Port Royal to Annapolis Royal.

The French, Mi'kmaq and Acadians made four attempts to retake the capital of Acadia during King George's War. Many of the Acadian inhabitants at Port Royal remained in the town after it became Annapolis Royal. However, during the French and Indian War, the British deported the Acadian residents at Annapolis Royal to British and French territories in the Expulsion of the Acadians, beginning in 1755, because they wanted to remove any military threat the Acadians posed and cut off vital supply lines the Acadians provided to the French Fortress of Louisbourg.

Demographics

See also 
Military history of Nova Scotia
 Grand-Pré
 Pisiguit
 Cobequid
 Beaubassin
 Port-Royal National Historic Site

Notes

References 

Acadian history
Buildings and structures in Annapolis County, Nova Scotia
Military forts in Acadia
Former colonial capitals in Canada
1632 establishments in the French colonial empire